Klaipėda railway station is a Lithuanian Railways station in Klaipėda. It is located at the northern part of the old town of the city. The current building was built in 1983. "Railroad station - a facility comprising ticket office, platforms, etc. for loading and unloading train passengers and freight".

History and architecture
The complex of buildings of Klaipėda railway station consists of two buildings. The old building made of yellow bricks and reflecting features of Classicism architecture was built in 1881. Nowadays commercial enterprises and cafeterias are used in this building.

The new building made of red bricks was built in 1983. Currently the main residency of Lithuanian Railways is established in this building.

At that time the total cost used for infrastructure of  Klaipėda railway station was 5,800,000 Prussian Thalers. In the beginning, only cargo trains used to carried Fish and Timber, their routes stations were Klaipėda-Šilutė and Klaipėda-Šilutė-Pagėgiai.

References

¢ The part of the History section is copied from the http://www.krastogidas.lt/ web page, a public domain resource.

External links

Buildings and structures in Klaipėda
Railway stations in Lithuania
Transport in Klaipėda